The Belfast Telegraph is a daily newspaper published in Belfast, Northern Ireland, by Independent News & Media. Its editor is Eoin Brannigan. Reflecting its unionist tradition, the paper has historically been "favoured by the Protestant population", while also being read within Catholic nationalist communities in Northern Ireland.

History
It was first published as the Belfast Evening Telegraph on 1 September 1870 by brothers William and George Baird. Its first edition cost half a penny and ran to four pages covering the Franco-Prussian War and local news.

The evening edition of the newspaper was originally called the "Sixth Late", and "Sixth Late Tele" was a familiar cry made by vendors in Belfast city centre in the past. Local editions were published for distribution to Enniskillen, Dundalk, Newry and Derry.

Its competitors are The News Letter and The Irish News, and local editions of London-based red tops also compete in this market, in some cases selling at a cheaper price than the "Tele".

Sometimes described as having "unionist leanings", and operating an editorial policy supportive of "moderate unionism", the Belfast Telegraph was bought by the Dublin-based Independent News & Media group in March 2000.

The Belfast Telegraph was entirely broadsheet until 19 February 2005, when the Saturday morning edition was introduced and all Saturday editions were converted to compact.  The weekday morning compact edition was launched on 22 March 2005.

In 2015, the Telegraph launched the magazine supplement Family Life.

The paper now publishes two editions daily, Belfast Telegraph final edition and the North West Telegraph which is distributed in Derry.

Its editor, since April 2020, is Eoin Brannigan.

Awards
The Belfast Telegraph was named as Best UK Regional Newspaper of the Year 2012 by the Society of Editors  Regional Press Awards.

Circulation
Reflecting a decline in newspaper sales generally, circulation of the Belfast Telegraph has declined as of the early 21st century, from 109,571 for the period July to December 2002, to 31,340 for the same period in 2019.

References

External links

 

1870 establishments in Ireland
Daily newspapers published in the United Kingdom
Independent News & Media
Mass media in Belfast
Newspapers published in Northern Ireland
Publications established in 1870